Badminton competitions at the 2015 Pan American Games in Toronto were held from July 11 to 16 at the Markham Pan Am Centre (Atos Markham Pan Am Centre) in Markham. Due to naming rights the arena was known as the latter for the duration of the games. A total of five badminton events will be held: two each for men and women, along with a mixed doubles event.

Venue

The competitions took at the Atos Markham Pan Am Centre (Markham Pan Am Centre) located in the city of Markham, about 31 kilometers from the athletes village. The arena had a capacity of 2,000 people per session (1,000 permanent seating + 1,000 temporary seats). The venue also hosted table tennis competitions later during the games. The venue hosted the water polo competitions, but in the other side of the centre (an Olympic sized pool).

Competition schedule
The following was the competition schedule for the badminton competitions:

Medal table

Medalists

Participating nations
A total of 18 countries qualified athletes. The number of athletes a nation entered is in parentheses beside the name of the country. El Salvador and Guyana made their sport debuts at the Pan American Games.

Qualification

A maximum total of 88 athletes (44 men and 44 women) qualified to compete at the games. A nation may enter a maximum of four athletes per gender. As host nation, Canada automatically qualified a full team of eights athletes. All other athletes qualified through the team world rankings as of February 26, 2015.

Controversy
Badminton Canada mistakenly entered three time defending Pan American Championships gold medalists Adrian Liu and Derrick Ng in overlapping events, which is a World Badminton Federation rule violation. Badminton Canada launched an appeal, however it was ultimately unsuccessful. Therefore, both athletes had to be withdrawn from the games.

See also
Badminton at the 2016 Summer Olympics

References

 
Events at the 2015 Pan American Games
Pan American Games
2015
Badminton tournaments in Canada